Andrew Gordon may refer to:

Andrew Gordon (historian), American historian of Japanese history
Andrew Gordon (ice hockey) (born 1985), Canadian hockey player
Andrew Gordon (naval historian) (born 1951), British naval historian
Andrew Gordon (racing driver) (born 1990), American racing driver
Andy Gordon, American television producer and writer
Andrew Gordon (Benedictine) (1712–1751), Scottish Benedictine monk, physicist, and inventor
Andrew Gordon (British Army officer) (died 1806), British general
Andy Gordon (footballer) (born 1944), Scottish footballer
Andrew D. Gordon, British computer scientist
Andrew P. Gordon (born 1962), US District Judge from Nevada
Andrew Gordon, half of 21st-century American husband-and-wife novelist duo Ilona Andrews

See also